Judson was a former small town in Swain County, North Carolina. It was evacuated for construction of the Fontana Dam on the Little Tennessee River, completed in 1944, which created the Fontana Lake reservoir upriver. Numerous historic towns and prehistoric sites were inundated by the lake. Some structures can be visited when the lake is at its yearly low.

Ghost towns in North Carolina
Towns in North Carolina
Geography of Swain County, North Carolina
Populated places inundated by the Tennessee Valley Authority